Marcolino Gomes Candau (30 May 1911 – 23 January 1983) was a Brazilian doctor who served as director-general of the World Health Organization (WHO) from 1953 to 1973. 

He did doctorate and other courses such as MPH, and FRCP before served at WHO.

Biography 
Candau was born in Rio de Janeiro and studied medicine at the state medical school in Rio de Janeiro and worked at the state department of Health before pursuing Masters in Public Health at Johns Hopkins University.

Candau returned to Brazil to work in the state public health department before joining the staff of the World Health Organization in Geneva in 1950 as Director of the Division of Organization of Health Services for the Americas. Within a year, he was appointed Assistant Director-General in charge of Advisory Services. In 1952, he moved to Washington as Assistant Director of the Pan American Sanitary Bureau—the WHO Regional Office for the Americas. In 1953, while occupying that position, he was elected, at the age of 42, WHO's second Director-General. As Director-General, Candau was influenced by his previous work in Brazil's malaria control program. He presented the case for global malaria eradication at the World Health Assembly meeting in Mexico City in May 1955. In 1958, 1963 and 1968, Dr Candau was re-elected for his successive terms in that office, which he held until 1973. In 1963 Candau received an honorary Sc.D. from Bates College.

Sources
 2006 Bates College Alumni Directory (Lewiston, ME: Bates College 2006)

References

1911 births
1983 deaths
World Health Organization officials
Johns Hopkins Bloomberg School of Public Health alumni
Rio de Janeiro State University alumni
Brazilian public health doctors
Brazilian officials of the United Nations
Léon Bernard Foundation Prize laureates